Jigger may refer to:

Tools and machines
 Jigger (bartending), used to measure out a jigger (1.5 US fluid ounces) of liquor
 Pallet jack, used to lift and move pallets
 Hydraulic jigger, a hydraulically powered mechanical winch
 Ice jigger, used for setting fish nets under ice between two distant holes
 Jigger, a machine for the shaping of clay body into flatware; see

Transportation
 Handcar (hand-operated) or railroad speeder (motorized), a railway car mostly used for maintenance
 Jiggermast, the aftmost mast of a four-masted sailing ship

Arts and entertainment
 "Jigger", a work by Li Cheng (painter) (919–967)
 Jigger, a large statue in Brownhills, West Midlands, England
 Jigger Craigin, a character in the musical Carousel

Places
 Jigger, Louisiana, United States, an unincorporated community
 Jigger, a local name for the settlement of South Tunbridge; see Tunbridge, Vermont, United States
 Jigger Inn, St Andrews, Scotland, an historic pub

People
 Jigger (nickname), a list of people
 Jigger, a person who engages in jigging, i.e. fishing with a jig lure

Other uses
 Tunga penetrans or chigoe flea, a tropical parasitic arthropod
 Jigger, the inner button of a double-breasted coat or jacket
 Jigger, an obsolete golf club that was a very low lofted iron with a shortened shaft

See also
 Jiggerpole, a very long fishing pole used with a very short and very heavy line